Kazimierz Badowski (15 August 1907, Regów Stary - 6 July 1990) was a leading Polish Communist activist.

Career
Working as a docker in Gdańsk, he rose through the ranks of the trade union movement to become a key figure in the Communist Party of Poland. In 1925, he left the party in the face of what he saw as an increasingly Stalinist ideological outlook. He became a leading Polish Trotskyist, founding the International Revolutionary Current, an informal network of various anti-Stalinist, Trotskyist and other Marxist organisations. He was able to survive all of the Nazi's concentration camps, only to be imprisoned by Stalin again the early 1950s and again from 1962 to 1964.

He was a keen Esperantist and strongly promoted the Esperanto language as part of the Trotskyist movement.

He died in 1990, living his later years paralysed and unable to communicate.

External links
Ludwik Hass, A Tribute to Kazimierz Badowski (1994)

1907 births
1990 deaths
People from Kozienice County
People from Radom Governorate
Communist Party of Poland politicians
Trotskyists
Polish Esperantists